New Zealand Clerical Workers' Union began in 1936 as Wellington Clerical Workers' Union. It negotiated the first general clerical workers award in 1936. Wellington amalgamated with other regional unions and finally formed New Zealand Clerical Workers Union.

The union was obliged to cease operating by the passing of the Employment Contracts Act 1991.

References

Trade unions in New Zealand
New Zealand labour law
Trade unions established in 1936
Trade unions disestablished in 1991